Stake may refer to:

Entertainment
 Stake: Fortune Fighters, a 2003 video game
 The Stake, a 1915 silent short film
 "The Stake", a 1977 song by The Steve Miller Band from Book of Dreams
 Stakes (miniseries), a Cartoon Network miniseries, aired as part of the seventh season of Adventure Time
 Stake (band)

People
 Dagnija Staķe (born 1951), Latvian politician
 Robert E. Stake (born 1927), Professor Emeritus of Education at the University of Illinois, Urbana-Champaign

Companies 

 Stake (platform), an Australian financial services company
 Stake.com, an online casino
 @stake, a computer services company

Other uses
 Equity (finance) stake, the part of a company or business owned by a shareholder
 Stake (Latter Day Saints), a regional organization in some Latter Day Saint churches
 Hill of Stake, a hill on the boundary between North Ayrshire and Renfrewshire, Scotland
 Sudis (stake) (Latin for "stake"), a fortification carried by Roman legionaries

See also
 Archer's stake, a defensive stake carried by medieval longbowmen
 Survey stakes, markers used by surveyors
 Torture stake, a method of execution similar to crucifixion, tying or nailing the victim to an upright pole in lieu of a cross
 Stakes race, a type of horse race
 Staking (manufacturing), a process for connecting two components
 Poker staking, financial backing a player
 Staker
 Stanchion, a kind of stake
 Staking (disambiguation)
 Steak (disambiguation)
 Steel fence post, a kind of stake